Rechlin is a municipality  in Mecklenburg-Western Pomerania, Germany, around 100 km (60 mi) northwest of Berlin. The town's airport has a long history and was the Luftwaffe's main testing ground for new aircraft designs in Nazi Germany. The Luftfahrttechnisches Museum (Aviation Technology Museum) in Rechlin houses displays of aircraft and related technology from the two World Wars and the Soviet era.

The town has become popular with travelers thanks to being located at one of the entrances to Müritz National Park.

People 
 Wilhelm Joachim von Hammerstein (1838-1904), German politician

References